Tihar Prisons, also called Tihar Jail and Tihar Ashram, is a prison complex in India and the largest complex of prisons in South Asia. Run by Department of Delhi Prisons, Government of Delhi, the prison contains nine central prisons, and is one of the three prison complexes in Delhi. The other two prison complexes are at Rohini and Mandoli with one and six central prisons respectively. Tihar prison complex is located in Janakpuri, approximately 3 km from Tihar village in West Delhi.

The prison is styled as a correctional institution. Its main objective is to convert its inmates into ordinary members of society by providing them with useful skills, education, and respect for the law. It aims to improve the inmates' self-esteem and strengthen their desire to improve. To engage, rehabilitate, and reform its inmates, Tihar uses music therapy, which involves music training sessions and concerts. The prison has its own radio station, run by inmates. There is also a prison industry within the walls, manned wholly by inmates, which bears the brand Tihar. , Tihar jail has 17,534 inmates against the sanctioned capacity of 10,026. The prison population as on 31.12.2019 has increased by 11.79% in comparison to the population as on 31.12.2018. That being said, some people have been executed at this jail.

History
Originally, Tihar was a maximum-security prison run by the State of Punjab.  In 1966 control was transferred to the National Capital Territory of Delhi.  Beginning in 1984, additional facilities were constructed, and the complex became Tihar Prison, also the largest jail in India.

Under the charge of IPS officer Kiran Bedi, when she was Inspector General of Prisons, she instituted a number of prison reforms at Tihar, including changing its name to Tihar Ashram. She also instituted a Vipassana meditation program for both staff and inmates; initial classes were taught by S. N. Goenka. The Prison has also produced an inmate who has passed the UPSC civil service examinations.

Many of the inmates continue their higher education through distance education. The campus placement program was launched in 2011 for the rehabilitation of inmates about to complete their sentences.

Jail factory
In 1961, the Jail Factory was established in Central Jail No.2, at Tihar. Over the years its activities have expanded to include Carpentry, Weaving (Handloom & Powerloom), Tailoring, Chemical, Handmade paper, Commercial art, and Bakery. Later in 2009, a shoe manufacturing unit was established using the Public-Private Partnership model, and thus the brand TJ's was launched. As of May 2014, 700 inmates work in these units, and 25% of their earnings are deposited in the Victim Welfare Fund, which provides compensation to the victims and their families.

Notable prisoners 
 Abhijit Banerjee – Indian born American nobel laureate. While studying in JNU, he was arrested and imprisoned in Tihar Jail during a protest after students surrounded the then Vice Chancellor PN Srivastava of the university
 Sanjay Gandhi – former Member of Parliament and husband of Menaka Gandhi, son of Indira Gandhi
 Kanhaiya Kumar – arrested for illegal involvement in various protests across India
 Lalu Prasad Yadav – former Union Minister of Railways, former Chief Minister of Bihar, incarcerated for Fodder scam 
 Subrata Roy – founder of Sahara India Pariwar
 Chhota Rajan – Mumbai-based gangster
 Sushil Kumar - Indian Wrestler, arrested in connection with the murder of a 23-year-old wrestler at Chhatrasal Stadium
 Satwant Singh and Kehar Singh – security guards, hanged for the assassination of Indira Gandhi
 Charles Sobhraj – an international serial killer, secretly escaped from Tihar on 16 March 1986, but was recaptured shortly thereafter, returned to the prison and sentenced to an additional ten years for the escape. He was released and deported on completion of his term on 17 February 1997
Ripun Bora – education minister of Assam's Tarun Gogoi-led Congressional government, the main suspect in the Daniel Topno murder case, was arrested by CBI officials on 3 June 2008 and sent to Tihar on 7 June 2008
 Suresh Kalmadi – former president of the Indian Olympic Association, who was arrested for alleged corruption regarding the 2010 Commonwealth Games
Amar Singh – former member of the Samajwadi Party, arrested in a cash-for-votes scandal
 Anna Hazare and Arvind Kejriwal – Indian social activists fighting against corruption, were imprisoned in Tihar for protesting conflicts between differing Civil Society and UPA Government anti-corruption bills, known as the Jan Lokpal Bill and the Lokpal Bill, respectively
 Jagtar Singh Hawara and Paramjit Singh Bheora, Khalistani militants, main accused in the assassination of Punjab Chief minister Beant Singh
 Jagtar Singh Johal-accused in 2016–17 targeted killings in Punjab, India
 Abhishek Verma – accused in Navy War Room Leak case & Scorpene Submarines deal.
 Anca Neacșu Verma – wife of Abhishek Verma, co-accused in all his corruption cases
 Afzal Guru – Kashmiri separatist and Jaish-e-Mohammed terrorist involved in the 2001 Indian Parliament attack, who was executed on 9 February 2013
 Maqbool Bhat – Kashmiri separatist who waged  war for secession of Kashmir as a separate state from India and Pakistan
 Milkha Singh – former Indian sprinter, for traveling in a train without ticket.
 P. Chidambaram – former Union Minister of Finance, Judicial custody in relation to the INX media Corruption case.
 D. K. Shivakumar – former Minister in Karnataka Govt., sent to prison in money laundering case.
 Sudhir Chaudhary – Indian journalist sent to 14-day judicial custody but was later released on bail in extortion case
 Kuljeet Singh and Jasbir Singh – executed in 1982 for the Geeta and Sanjay Chopra kidnapping case
 The accused in the 2G spectrum case, including A. Raja, M. K. Kanimozhi, Vinod Goenka, Shahid Balwa, and Sanjay Chandra
 5 of the accused in the 2012 Delhi gang rape; Ram Singh (committed suicide in March 2013), Mukesh Singh, Akshay Thakur, Pawan Gupta & Vinay Sharma; they were hanged on 4 March 2020
 Sanjay Dutt, Indian actor and businessman

Escapes
Sher Singh Rana, who had been arrested for the murder of Phoolan Devi in 2001, escaped from Tihar jail in February 2004. He was arrested again in 2006, in Kolkata.

In June 2015, two prisoners who were waiting for their trial in Tihar jail escaped through a tunnel.

Health concerns
The prison complex has no facilities for keeping paraplegic pre-trial inmates or convicts.

The Integrated Counseling and Testing Centre reports that around 6% to 8% of the 11,800 Tihar inmates are HIV-positive, which is considerably higher than the HIV rate among the general population in India.

In popular culture
Doing Time, Doing Vipassana is a 1997 documentary about the introduction of S. N. Goenka's 10-day Vipassana classes at Tihar Jail in 1993 by then Inspector General of Prisons in New Delhi, Kiran Bedi. Bedi had her guards trained in Vipassana first, and then she had Goenka give his initial class to 1,000 prisoners.

See also 
 Black Warrant, non-fiction book about prisoners in the jail

References

External links
 Tihar Prisons Official website 
 Tihar Prisons Official Website 

Prisons in India
Government buildings in Delhi
1957 establishments in Delhi
Law enforcement in Delhi